The 2009 Kelly Cup Playoffs of the ECHL began on April 9, 2009.  The 16 teams that qualified, eight from each conference, played a best-of-7 series for division semifinals, finals and conference finals.  The conference champions played a best-of-7 series for the Kelly Cup.

Three league records were set during the first round of the playoffs.  Game One of the North Division semifinals became the longest game in ECHL history, as the Elmira Jackals defeated the Trenton Devils 5 – 4 in a game that lasted 126:10.  Elmira's Josh Aspenlind scored the game-winning goal at 6:10 of the fourth overtime.  Previously, the longest game was the Greenville Grrrowl's 3 – 2 four overtime victory against the Louisiana IceGators in Game Two of the 2000 Southern Conference Finals, which lasted 121:24.  The game saw another league record fall, as Elmira and Trenton combined for 145 shots on goal (75 for Trenton, 70 for Elmira), besting the 139 combined shots on goal by Louisiana (82) and the Jackson Bandits (57) in Jackson's 5 – 4 triple overtime victory in Game Two of the 2002 Southwest Division Semifinals.  Elmira's goaltender, Michael Teslak made the third most saves in a single game in ECHL history with 71.

April 22 also went down in the ECHL history books as for the first time in the league's 21-year history, two Game 7s were played on the same day as the Stockton Thunder defeated the Ontario Reign 5 – 4 and the Las Vegas Wranglers defeated the Bakersfield Condors 5 – 1, both games were Pacific Division Semifinals matchups.

The Division finals saw the defending Kelly Cup champion Cincinnati Cyclones and the Alaska Aces cruise to easy Conference finals berths, under completely different circumstances.  Cincinnati swept Elmira after both teams went the full seven games in their opening series, while Alaska defeated the Victoria Salmon Kings four games to one with both teams having an extended rest, with Victoria sweeping their opening series and Alaska winning their series in five games. The South Carolina Stingrays required a little more effort to oust the Florida Everblades, who sat atop the league's regular season standings, defeating them in six games to advance to play the Cyclones in the conference finals.

Three (Alaska, Cincinnati and South Carolina) of the four teams in the Conference Finals were former Kelly Cup Champions.  The American Conference finals was a rematch of the 2008 edition with Cincinnati taking on South Carolina and Las Vegas made their second consecutive trip to the National Conference finals, taking on their most heated rival the Alaska Aces.

The South Carolina Stingrays led the Alaska Aces, 3-1, headed to Game 5 before blowing the lead, and having to face a Game 7, where the Stingrays clinched their third Kelly Cup with a 4-2 win, winning the series, 4-3.  The Stingrays tied the ECHL record for most ECHL championships, with three.  South Carolina would get their revenge on Cincinnati for defeating the Stingrays in the 2008 American Conference finals by sweeping the Cyclones in four games.  The National Conference finals had the same results with Alaska sweeping Las Vegas in four games.

Playoff seeds 
After the 2008–09 ECHL regular season, 16 teams qualified for the playoffs. The top four teams from each division qualified for the playoffs. The Florida Everblades were the American Conference regular season champions as well as the Brabham Cup winners with the best overall regular season record. The Alaska Aces were the National Conference regular season champions.  South Carolina goaltender James Reimer was named the Kelly Cup Finals MVP.

American Conference

North Division 
 Cincinnati Cyclones - 87 points
 Trenton Devils - 87 points
 Elmira Jackals - 85 points
 Wheeling Nailers - 80 points

South Division 
 Florida Everblades - American Conference regular season champions, Brabham Cup winners, 103 points
 South Carolina Stingrays - 90 points
 Charlotte Checkers - 76 points
 Gwinnett Gladiators - 68 points

National Conference

Pacific Division 
 Ontario Reign - 82 points
 Las Vegas Wranglers - 76 points
 Bakersfield Condors - 74 points
 Stockton Thunder - 71 points

West Division 
 Alaska Aces - National Conference regular season champions, 93 points
 Idaho Steelheads - 92 points
 Victoria Salmon Kings - 83 points
 Utah Grizzlies - 72 points

Bracket

Statistical leaders

Skaters

These are the top ten skaters based on points.

GP = Games played; G = Goals; A = Assists; Pts = Points; +/– = Plus/minus; PIM = Penalty minutes; Yellow shade = team still in playoffs

All statistics as of: 08:00, 5 June 2009 (UTC)

Goaltending

These are the top five goaltenders based on both goals against average and save percentage with at least one game played (Note: list is sorted by goals against average).

GP = Games played; W = Wins; L = Losses; SA = Shots against; GA = Goals against; GAA = Goals against average; SV% = Save percentage; SO = Shutouts; TOI = Time on ice (in minutes); Yellow shade = team still in playoffs

All statistics as of: 08:00, 5 June 2009 (UTC)

Division Semifinals 
Note 1: All times are local.
Note 2: Game times in italics signify games to be played only if necessary.
Note 3: Home team is listed first.

American Conference

North Division

(N1) Cincinnati Cyclones vs. (N4) Wheeling Nailers

(N2) Trenton Devils vs. (N3) Elmira Jackals

South Division

(S1) Florida Everblades vs. (S4) Gwinnett Gladiators

(S2) South Carolina Stingrays vs. (S3) Charlotte Checkers 

NOTE:  Neither team's home arena was available in the first week of the ECHL playoffs;  Time Warner Cable Arena was unavailable for this round (final week of NBA games by the Charlotte Bobcats, and the North Charleston Coliseum had rehearsals for a concert tour.  The ECHL arranged the playoff series in the following order:  two games at the Extreme Ice Center, three games at the North Charleston Coliseum, and then one game at the Extreme Ice Center.  Had a seventh game been necessary, it would have been played at the North Charleston Coliseum.

National Conference

Pacific Division

(P1) Ontario Reign vs. (P4) Stockton Thunder

(P2) Las Vegas Wranglers vs. (P3) Bakersfield Condors

West Division

(W1) Alaska Aces vs. (W4) Utah Grizzlies

(W2) Idaho Steelheads vs. (W3) Victoria Salmon Kings

Division Finals

American Conference

North Division

(N1) Cincinnati Cyclones vs. (N3) Elmira Jackas

South Division

(S1) Florida Everblades vs. (S2) South Carolina Stingrays

National Conference

Pacific Division

(P2) Las Vegas Wranglers vs. (P4) Stockton Thunder 

NOTE:  Arena conflicts led to the ECHL shifting the first games of the playoff series.

West Division

(W1) Alaska Aces vs. (W3) Victoria Salmon Kings

Conference finals

American Conference

(S2) South Carolina Stingrays vs. (N1) Cincinnati Cyclones

National Conference

(W1) Alaska Aces vs. (P2) Las Vegas Wranglers

Kelly Cup Finals

(W1) Alaska Aces vs. (S2) South Carolina Stingrays

References

See also 
2008–09 ECHL season
List of ECHL seasons

Kelly Cup playoffs
2008–09 ECHL season